The intermediate bandy-bandy (Vermicella intermedia) is a species of snake in the family Elapidae.

It is endemic to Australia.

Habitat and distribution 
The snakes are found in Western Australia and the Northern Territory.

References 

Taxa named by J. Scott Keogh
Taxa named by Sarah A. Smith
Vermicella
Snakes of Australia